

Countess of Anhalt

Princess of Anhalt

Princess of Anhalt-Aschersleben

Princess of Anhalt-Bernburg, 1252–1468

Princess of Anhalt-Zerbst, 1252–1396

Princess of Anhalt-Dessau, 1396–1561

Princess of Anhalt-Köthen 1396–1561

Princess of Anhalt-Dessau, 1603-1807

Princess of Anhalt-Bernburg, 1603–1807

Princess of Anhalt-Harzgerode, 1635–1709

Anhalt-Bernburg-Schaumburg-Hoym

Princess of Anhalt-Zeitz-Hoym (1718–1727)

Princess of Anhalt-Bernburg-Schaumburg-Hoym (1727–1812)

Princess of Anhalt-Plötzkau, 1544-1553

Princess of Anhalt-Zerbst, 1544–1796

Princess of Anhalt-Köthen 1603–1806

Princess of Anhalt-Pless, 1764-1847

Duchess of Anhalt

Duchess of Anhalt-Bernburg, 1803–1863

Duchess of Anhalt-Köthen, 1806-1847

Duchess of Anhalt-Dessau, 1807-1863

Duchess of Anhalt, 1863–1918

Titular Duchess of Anhalt, 1918–present

Consorts of Anhalt
 
Duchesses of Anhalt
Anhalt
Anhalt